Maan Gaye Ustaad is a 1981 Indian Bollywood film directed by Shibu Mitra and produced by S.K. Kapur. It stars Shashi Kapoor and Hema Malini in pivotal roles.

Cast
 Ashok Kumar as Jailor
 Shashi Kapoor as Kishan / Prince Daulat Singh 
 Hema Malini as Geeta Singh / Princess Shabnam
 Bindu as Jaikishan's Assistant
 Ajit as Jaikishan "J.K."
 Amjad Khan as Shera 
 Pran as Chandan Singh
 Om Prakash as Abba

Soundtrack

External links

1980s Hindi-language films
1981 films
Films scored by Sonik-Omi
Films directed by Shibu Mitra